FC Balakovo was a Russian football team from Balakovo. It played professionally from 1966 to 1974 and from 1993 to 2002. Their best result was 2nd place in Zone 4 of the Soviet Second League in 1969.

Team name history
 1966–1968: FC Khimik Balakovo
 1969–1992: FC Kord Balakovo
 1993–1997: FC Volga Balakovo
 1998–2002: FC Balakovo

External links
  Team history at KLISF

Association football clubs established in 1966
Association football clubs disestablished in 2002
Defunct football clubs in Russia
Sport in Saratov Oblast
1966 establishments in Russia
2002 disestablishments in Russia